Saint Monica Preparatory is a parochial, co-educational school in Santa Monica, California, consisting of students in grades kindergarten to grade 12. It is located in the Roman Catholic Archdiocese of Los Angeles and serves the parish of St. Monica. The school in its current organizational structure was formed by the merging of the parish elementary and high schools into a single TK–12 school, but the elementary and high schools remain on their respective separate campuses.

Background
Saint Monica was established in 1899 by the Sisters of the Holy Names of Jesus and Mary.
The academy housed both an elementary school and a high school until 1930, when the elementary school became the "Saint Monica Parish Elementary School" and was transferred to its present site on Seventh Street. The school was sold in 1935, and Saint Monica High School was opened in 1939.  The women's high school and the men's high schools were operated separately until the fall of 1968, when classroom instruction became co-educational.

The elementary and high schools had long been affiliated with one another as parish schools serving the St. Monica Catholic Church but were administered separately. In the spring of 2022, the school board announced that the two schools would merge into one legal entity under a single administration beginning in the 2022–23 academic year. The TK-12 school would be rebranded as Saint Monica Preparatory.

Notable alumni

 Donna Corcoran, actress
 Bison Dele, formerly Brian Williams, basketball player
 Steven M. Hilton, businessman and philanthropist. His mother Marilyn is also an alumnus.
 Adrian Klemm, football player
 Bob Klein, football player for USC, LA Rams and San Diego Chargers
 Michael Klesic, actor
 Daniel "Danny" Moder, cameraman, husband of Julia Roberts
 Jason Patric, actor
 Terry Schofield, basketball player on three NCAA Championship teams at UCLA under legendary coach John Wooden. German Professional Basketball League player and coach.
 Leon Wood, NBA Basketball player and referee
 The Lennon Sisters, singing family
 Randy Pedersen (1980), professional bowler, color analyst for ESPN coverage of PBA Tour
 Robert Wagner, actor
 Marcellus Wiley, National Football League Pro Bowl defensive lineman, Columbia University Hall of Fame, former ESPN TV and Radio Host, now co-host on Speak for Yourself
 C.J. Wallace, actor, musician, son of The Notorious B.I.G. and Faith Evans.

References

External links
 

Catholic secondary schools in California
1899 establishments in California
Buildings and structures in Santa Monica, California
Educational institutions established in 1899
Organizations based in Santa Monica, California
Roman Catholic secondary schools in Los Angeles County, California